Strikeforce: Overeem vs. Werdum, was a mixed martial arts event held by Strikeforce.  The event took place on June 18, 2011 at the American Airlines Center in Dallas, Texas, United States. The main card aired on Showtime while the preliminary card aired on HDNet.

Background
Originally scheduled for April 9, this event hosted the two remaining quarter-final fights in the Strikeforce Heavyweight Grand Prix tournament.

Muhammed Lawal was expected to fight Ovince St. Preux at this event, but the bout was later cancelled.

Scott Smith had indicated that he hoped to fight at this event, however he instead fought Tarec Saffiedine at Strikeforce: Fedor vs. Henderson the following month.

Shane Del Rosario was scheduled to face Daniel Cormier in a Heavyweight Grand Prix reserve bout. However, Del Rosario had to pull out of the bout after a car accident in early May. Jeff Monson stepped in as a replacement to face Cormier in the reserve bout. After his victory, Cormier was selected to replace Alistair Overeem in the tournament semifinals following his removal from the tournament in July 2011.

Amanda Nunes was scheduled to face Julie Kedzie at this event, but a hairline fracture in her foot forced Nunes off the card.

Gina Carano was scheduled to make her Strikeforce return against Sarah D'Alelio.  While medically approved by the Texas Department of Licensing and Regulation, Carano opted to pull out of the fight on the advice of her own doctor.

Brian Melancon weighed in 4 pounds over the welterweight non-title bout allowance of 171 lb.

Results

Heavyweight Grand Prix Bracket

** = Replacement

References

Overeem vs. Werdum
2011 in mixed martial arts
Mixed martial arts in Dallas
2011 in sports in Texas